The Kentucky Supreme Court was created by a 1975 constitutional amendment and is the state supreme court of the U.S. state of Kentucky.  Prior to that the Kentucky Court of Appeals was the only appellate court in Kentucky.  The Kentucky Court of Appeals is now Kentucky's intermediate appellate court.

Criminal appeals involving a sentence of death, life imprisonment, or imprisonment of twenty years or more are heard directly by the Kentucky Supreme Court, bypassing the Kentucky Court of Appeals.  All other cases are heard on a discretionary basis on appeal from the Kentucky Court of Appeals.

The Kentucky Supreme Court promulgates the Rules of Court and Rules of Evidence. Through two of its subagencies, the Kentucky Office of Bar Admissions (KYOBA) and Kentucky Bar Association (KBA), it is the final arbiter for bar admissions (KYOBA) and discipline (KBA).

In the event that two or more justices of the Kentucky Supreme Court recuse themselves from a case, the Governor of Kentucky appoints Special Justices to sit for that particular case.

The court meets in a courtroom located on the second floor of the Kentucky State Capitol in Frankfort.  The second floor of the capitol building is also home to offices for the justices and Supreme Court personnel.

The Administrative Office of the Courts (AOC), under the aegis of the Kentucky Supreme Court, serves as the administrative support agency for Kentucky courts and Circuit Court Clerks.  The role of the AOC is similar to that of the Legislative Research Commission (LRC) for the Kentucky General Assembly.

Notable cases

In its short history, the Kentucky Supreme Court has not produced much jurisprudence of note.  A study published in 2007 by the Supreme Court of California found that of all state supreme courts in the United States, the decisions of the Kentucky Supreme Court were the least followed by other states' appellate courts.

Notable decisions of the Kentucky Supreme Court include Kentucky v. Wasson, 842 S.W.2d 487 (Ky. 1992), in which the court invalidated the criminalization of same-sex sodomy as a state equal protection violation. This Kentucky decision, based on the Kentucky Constitution, was made at a time when the applicable federal equal protection precedent was Bowers v. Hardwick, 478 U.S. 186 (1986), which held that federal constitutional protection of the right of privacy was not implicated in laws penalizing homosexual sodomy.   In 2003, the United States Supreme Court reversed itself and overturned Bowers, issuing a decision in Lawrence v. Texas, 539 U.S. 558 (2003) that mirrored Kentucky's Wasson ruling.

In Cameron v EMW Women’s Surgical Center et al. (2023), the Court upheld the constitutionality of Kentucky’s total abortion ban.

Current justices 
Justices are elected in nonpartisan elections to eight-year terms. In case of a vacancy the governor makes an appointment from a list of three names provided by the Kentucky Judicial Nominating Commission.

See also 

Courts of Kentucky

References

External links 
Website of the Kentucky Supreme Court
Database of Kentucky Supreme Court Opinions

Kentucky law
Kentucky state courts
State supreme courts of the United States
1976 establishments in Kentucky
Courts and tribunals established in 1976